Jair Tavares da Silva (born 3 August 1994), known as Jair, is a Brazilian professional footballer who plays as a midfielder for Liga I club Petrolul Ploiești.

Career
Jair started out his senior career with Ituano in 2015, featuring sparringly for the Brazilian side before moving to AC Oulu the next year. He spent his first season in the Ykkönen on loan, after which he signed a permanent contract. In the 2018 season, Jair was voted the league's Midfielder of the Year by the Football Players Association.

In November 2018, Jair joined Veikkausliiga club Ilves, where he played for two seasons. On 13 November 2020, he chose to stay in Finland and its first division by agreeing to a two-year contract with the option of another year with HJK. On 13 June 2022, the Helsinki-based team terminated Jair's deal after media reported that he had been convicted of child sexual abuse one year earlier.

Four days after his dismissal from HJK, Jair signed a two-year contract with Romanian club Petrolul Ploiești, recently promoted to the Liga I. Petrolul stated that it took note of his conviction in Finland, but considered that his subsequent behaviour should allow him to work and provide for his family.

Personal life
In 2016, Jair was accused by a 12-year-old girl from Oulu, Finland, of kissing her and trying to put her pants down; he was aware of her age, admitted to the kiss, but denied the sexual touching. He received a seven-month suspended sentence for child sexual abuse and paid the victim a €1,500 fine.

Career statistics

Club

Honours
Ituano
Copa Paulista runner-up: 2015

Ilves
Finnish Cup: 2019

HJK
Veikkausliiga: 2021
Finnish Cup runner-up: 2021

Individual
Veikkausliiga Breakthrough of the Year: 2019
Veikkausliiga Team of the Year: 2021

References

External links

1994 births
Living people
People from Alagoas
Brazilian footballers
Association football midfielders
Ituano FC players
Veikkausliiga players
Ykkönen players
AC Oulu players
FC Ilves players
Helsingin Jalkapalloklubi players
Liga I players
FC Petrolul Ploiești players
Brazilian expatriate footballers
Brazilian expatriate sportspeople in Finland
Expatriate footballers in Finland
Brazilian expatriate sportspeople in Romania
Expatriate footballers in Romania